Senotong is a community council located in the Thaba-Tseka District of Lesotho. Its population in 2006 was 7,742.

Villages
The community of Senotong includes the villages of Bahaleng, Bahaoleng, Foreisetata, Ha Kalakatana, Ha Lekiba, Ha Maramane, Ha Matona, Ha Mokhantši, Ha Mokoto, Ha Pene, Ha Rahlena, Ha Ratau, Ha Sekila, Ha Thene, Ha Tiela, Ha Tlelase, Ha Toeba, Iketleng, Kholoang, Kholong, Lekhalong, Lihloahloeng, Linotšing, Lioling, Liseleng, Litšoeneng, Maforeisetateng, Maiseng, Makhalong, Manganeng, Maqhoane, Mathueleng, Matikeng, Matsoapong, Meseeaneng, Mohloling, Mononong, Peteletsa, Phakoeng, Pontšeng, Ranthoto, Sekhutlong, Sekolopata, Sephokong, Taung, Thaba-Bosiu and Tšoeu-Khala.

References

External links
 Google map of community villages

Populated places in Thaba-Tseka District
Thaba-Tseka District